Saudi National Day ( al-Yawm al-Waṭanī lil-Mamlaka al-ʿArabiyya as-Saʿūdiyya) is a public holiday in Saudi Arabia celebrated annually on 23 September to commemorate a proclamation that renamed the Kingdom of Nejd and Hejaz as the Kingdom of Saudi Arabia in 1932 through a royal decree by King Abdulaziz al-Saud. It is one of the three non-religious national holidays observed in the country, other being the Saudi Founding Day and Saudi Flag Day.  

23 September was first observed when King Faisal issued a royal decree on 21 August 1965 that declared the day to be celebrated at official levels as per the Gregorian calendar. In 2005, King Abdullah issued a royal decree that officially declared it a national holiday from 2007 onwards.The number of lunar, not solar, years are commemorated.

Establishment of Saudi Arabia
King Abdulaziz was able to conquer the oases of Riyadh in 1902; and al-Hasa in 1913, and by 1925, he unified both Nejd and the Hejaz after defeating the forces of Sharif Hussein. On 23 September 1932, King Abdulaziz changed the name of his realm to his family name, the House of Saud.

Customs
Saudi National Day is celebrated with folk dances, songs, and traditional festivities. Roads and buildings are decorated with Saudi flags, and people wear the national colours of green and white, and display balloons in the same.

Events and occasions on the same day
 2005: King Abdullah announces that Saudi National Day became an official holiday.
 2009: King Abdullah opened the King Abdullah University of Science and Technology, in the presence of foreign heads of state.
 2014: Jeddah unveils the tallest flagpole in the world
 2015: Saudi National Day is first celebrated officially.

See also
 Public holidays in Saudi Arabia
 Flag of Saudi Arabia
 National Anthem of Saudi Arabia

References

History of Saudi Arabia
National days
September observances